The Players Tour Championship 2010/2011 – Event 1 (also known as Star Xing Pai Players Tour Championship 2010/2011 – Event 1 for sponsorship purposes) was a professional minor-ranking snooker tournament that took place over 24–27 June 2010 at the World Snooker Academy in Sheffield, England. It was contested by 75 professional players and 73 amateurs.

Kurt Maflin made the 71st official maximum break during his last 128 match against Michał Zieliński. This was Maflin's first official 147.

Mark Williams won the final 4–0 against Stephen Maguire.

Prize fund and ranking points
The breakdown of prize money and ranking points of the event is shown below:

1 Only professional players can earn ranking points.

Main draw

Preliminary round
Best of 7 frames

Main rounds

Top half

Section 1

Section 2

Section 3

Section 4

Bottom half

Section 5

Section 6

Section 7

Section 8

Finals

Final

Century breaks

147  Kurt Maflin
141, 129  Mark Selby
138, 118  Tony Drago
137, 129, 124, 124, 114  Stephen Maguire
136  Jordan Brown
136  Dave Harold
134, 130  Anthony McGill
134  Jamie Jones
133  Joe Jogia
129, 108  Andrew Higginson
129, 103  Tom Ford
124  Fergal O'Brien
122  Ronnie O'Sullivan
121  Andrew Norman
119  Marco Fu
117  Alan McManus

115  Patrick Wallace
114  Michał Zieliński 
112, 102, 100, 100  Jamie Cope
111  Judd Trump
110, 100  Hugh Abernethy
109, 109  Stephen Lee
107  Daniel Wells
106  Stuart Bingham
106  Jimmy Robertson
104  Nick Jennings
104  Peter Ebdon
103  Jamie Burnett
101  Rory McLeod
101  Mike Dunn
101  Alfie Burden

References

1
2010 in English sport

sv:Players Tour Championship 2010/2011#Players Tour Championship 1